So Excited may refer to:

"So Excited" (Fat Joe song), 2017 song by American rapper Fat Joe
"So Excited" (Christine McVie song), 1984 song by English musician Christine McVie
"So Excited" (Janet Jackson song), 2006 song by American singer-songwriter Janet Jackson
So Excited!, 1982 album by American vocal group the Pointer Sisters

See also
I'm So Excited (disambiguation)